The R262 is a proposed New Technology Train-series subway car for the New York City Subway. It is expected to replace the current R62 and R62A rolling stock, which are used on the subway's A Division and were built in the mid-1980s.

Component orders 
The R262 order is divided into a base order and two option orders. The base order consists of 504 cars, the first option order consists of 445 cars, and the second option order has up to 415 cars. The subway car order will entirely replace the R62 and R62A fleets, and the second option order will include up to 225 cars to support ridership growth and other operational needs. The R262 order will consist of cars in 5-car sets for the mainline IRT and 6-car sets for the 42nd Street Shuttle. The base order and first option order (949 cars) will be funded in the Metropolitan Transportation Authority (MTA)'s 2020-2024 Capital Program, while the second option order (up to 415 cars) will be funded in the future 2025–2029 Capital Program.

Features 

The design of the R262 subway cars is based on the specifications of the R211 cars, which are being built for the B Division. They will have modern signage and communication, an ethernet network, and updated crash energy management standards. The R262s will adopt open-gangways, allowing passengers to move between cars during train movement. They will be equipped with communications-based train control (CBTC). Unlike the R211s, R262s will have additional audio induction loops for riders with hearing impairments.

Like the R211s, these subway cars will have a blue front with large windows, LED headlights, and a blue strip with gold accents on the sides, similar to the new MTA Regional Bus Operations livery released in 2016. To designate the route, a large LED screen with the route bullet will be displayed at the ends of the train similar to trains with single rollsigns (R40 to R68). The train's destination will be displayed above the door on the front.

History 
On January 22, 2019, the MTA announced that it would order a fleet of approximately 1,500 subway cars in future capital programs allowing the agency to accelerate its plans to install CBTC on the IRT Lexington Avenue Line as part of the Fast Forward Plan. Because the 1,139 R62 and R62A subway cars do not have necessary equipment and network infrastructure to become CBTC-equipped, the agency decided to order a new fleet of CBTC-equipped cars to replace them.

On September 16, 2019, the MTA released its 2020–2024 Capital Program, including funding to purchase approximately 900 A Division subway cars, with $1.5 billion provided for a base order, and $1.4 billion for an option to purchase additional A Division cars. The document also stated that the production of additional A Division subway cars would be part of the future 2025–2029 Capital Program.

In January 2020, the New York City Transit (NYCT) sent a request to the MTA Board, asking for permission to forgo competitive bidding for the contract and issue a request for proposals (RFP) for the order, which would now consist of 1,364 cars with all options exercised, instead of approximately 1,500 cars. In addition, NYCT asked the Board to approve a modification to the agency's contract with CH2M Hill (now Jacobs) for consulting services for the R211 subway car order, extending its term by a year so consulting services for the R262 order could be completed as under the same contract. In late February 2020, the MTA issued the RFP, with plans to award the contract in early 2021. , the MTA has not awarded the contract.

Notes

References 

New York City Subway rolling stock
Electric multiple units of the United States
Proposed public transportation in New York City